Vernon Center is an unincorporated community and census-designated place (CDP) located in Vernon Township, in Sussex County, New Jersey, United States. As of the 2010 United States Census, the CDP's population was 1,713.

Geography
According to the United States Census Bureau, the CDP had a total area of 2.957 square miles (7.657 km2), including 2.939 square miles (7.611 km2) of land and 0.018 square miles (0.047 km2) of water (0.61%).

Demographics

Census 2010

References

Census-designated places in Sussex County, New Jersey
Vernon Township, New Jersey